The 2015 Chicago Red Stars season is the seventh season of the soccer club and its third season in National Women's Soccer League. For the first time in NWSL the Red Stars advanced to the playoffs by finishing second in regular season. In addition, the team held the first place for ten consecutive weeks, from week 4 to week 13. However, the club could not reach the NWSL championship, as in the playoffs semi-final the Red Stars lost to the reigning Champion FC Kansas City, by a score of 0–3. It was the club's final season playing home games at the Village of Lisle-Benedictine University Sports Complex.

First-team squad

Roster
Players who were under contract to play for the club in 2015 NWSL season.

Reserve players of first-team
Reserve players who appeared in the club's game day rosters during regular season. They should not to be confused with the Chicago Red Stars Reserves team which compete in Women's Premier Soccer League.

Squad correct as of August 16, 2015

Player movement

Management and staff 
Front Office
 Owner Arnim Whisler
Coaching Staff
Manager Rory Dames
First Assistant and Goalkeeper Coach Trae Manny
Second Assistant Coach Christian Lavers

Regular-season standings

Results summary

Results by round

Match results

Preseason

National Women's Soccer League

Regular season

Postseason playoff

NWSL awards

Squad statistics
Source: NWSL

Key to positions: FW – Forward, MF – Midfielder, DF – Defender, GK – Goalkeeper

Chicago Red Stars team awards
On September 23 Chicago Red Stars announced the winners of 2015 team awards. For the second time in 2 years Julie Johnston was the recipient of the award for Defensive Most Valuable Player, having been named Defender of the Year in 2014. Lori Chalupny who was the Team Most Valuable Player in 2014, was named the Iron Women of Character. Christen Press was named Team Most Valuable player, and was in 2014 the Golden Boot recipient. Danielle Colaprico was named the team's Rookie of the Year, while she was also the recipient of the NWSL Rookie of the Year. Vanessa DiBernardo who had a team high of 5 assists, and served a team high of 73 corner kicks, was named the Unsung Hero.

Team Most Valuable Player
Christen Press

Defensive Most Valuable Player
Julie Johnston

Rookie of the Year
Danielle Colaprico

Unsung Hero
Vanessa DiBernardo

Iron Woman of Character
Lori Chalupny

Images

Notes

References

Match reports (preseason)

Match reports (regular season)

Match report (postseason playoff)

2015
Chicago Red Stars
Chicago Red Stars
Chicago Red Stars